R. Navaneetha Krishna Pandian was an Indian politician and former Member of the Legislative Assembly. He was elected to the Tamil Nadu legislative assembly as a Gandhi Kamaraj Congress Party candidate from Alangulam constituency in 1980 election.

Electoral performance

References 

Tamil Nadu politicians
Living people
Year of birth missing (living people)